HRH General Crown Prince Trailokya Bir Bikram Shah Deva (November 30, 1847 – March 30, 1878) was, as the eldest son of King Surendra of Nepal, the heir apparent to the throne of Nepal. He died under suspicious circumstances before his father, paving the way for his young son Prithvi to ascend the throne.

Life

Crown Prince Trailokya was the son of King Surendra and his second wife, Trailokya Rajya Lakshmi Devi. He was educated privately.

Crown Prince Trailokya first married three daughters of Jung Bahadur Rana: Tara Rajya Lakshmi Devi, then Lalit Rajeshwori Rajya Lakshmi Devi and Somgarva Divyeshwari Rajya Lakshmi Devi (in the same ceremony with the two sisters). Whilst his senior wives bore him two sons and two daughters, he had five sons and several daughters by junior wives, some of whom were from local noble clans. The Crown Prince also had several children by concubines.

At that time, the King of Nepal had little power: the country was ruled by the Rana prime minister. The royal family was bereft of any real political leadership. The Sanad of 1856 had assigned all power to the Rana prime minister. Crown Prince Trailokya, upon reaching his maturity in 1875, decided to regain the royal prerogatives that his father had lost in 1856. With the help of his Sahebju brother Mahila Sahebju Narendra Bikram of Gorkha and Jagat Jang, a son of Jang Bahadur Rana, the Crown Prince set a plan by which the order of succession according to the 1856 Sanad would be put aside in the event of Jung Bahadur's death; in such a case, Prince Trailokya would force King Surendra to abdicate and appoint Jagat Jang as the Prime Minister. The plan was, however, unsuccessful. After Jung Bahadur died in Patherghatta, his youngest brother Dhir Shamsher spread the news that Jung Bahadur had not died, but was only critically ill. As Crown Prince Trailokya and Jagat Jang rushed to Patharghat, Dhir Shamsher compelled King Surendra to appoint Ranodip Singh Kunwar as the next prime minister, as per the laws of succession.

Crown Prince Trailokya died in 1878, under suspicious circumstances, after which his son PrithiviBir ascended the throne. Whilst his eldest son King Prithivi was kept as a glorified prisoner and ceremonial monarch at Narayanhiti Royal Palace, his younger sons, the Sahebjus, were exiled to several districts of Nepal including Dhankuta, Palpa Gauda, Birgunj and also India from Hanuman Dhoka Royal Palace to prevent any repeated attempts at regaining royal prerogatives. The Crown Prince's Sahebju children continued to lead honourable lives in their areas or Dukedoms with full State benefits and were free to occasionally travel to their Hanuman Dhoka Royal Palace residence in Kathmandu. However, due to fears of a coup, restrictions were imposed on the families following the end of PM Bir Sumsher's rule and the start of PM Chandra Sumsher's, especially in relation to getting an audience from their brother HM King PrithiviBir at Narayanhiti Royal Palace, Kathmandu.

References

https://www.scribd.com/document/422236099/1981-A-Short-History-of-Nepal-by-Thapa-s-pdf 

1847 births
1878 deaths
Nepalese princes
Heirs apparent who never acceded
19th-century Nepalese nobility
Nepalese Hindus